Gage Gubrud (born May 15, 1995) is a former gridiron football quarterback. He played college football for the Eastern Washington Eagles and the Washington State Cougars.

Early years
Gubrud graduated from McMinnville High School in McMinnville, Oregon, in 2014. As a senior, Gubrud completed 59.7 percent of his passes, with 18 touchdowns and 13 interceptions. He led the Grizzlies to the second round of the OSAA 6A Playoffs and also earned All-Pacific Conference honors.

College career
Gubrud was lightly recruited, receiving zero Division I scholarship offers. Gubrud would eventually decide to join Eastern Washington as a preferred walk-on, in the process turning down a scholarship offer from Division III school Linfield in Oregon.

2014–15
Gubrud redshirted in 2014. In 2015, he saw action primarily as a kick holder. Gubrud played in one game as a quarterback, completing 7-of-13 passes for 66 yards and an interception in a loss to Montana.

2016
In 2016, Gubrud won the starting quarterback job, beating out former starter and senior, Jordan West. In his first career start against Washington State, Gubrud went 34-for-40 for 474 yards and five touchdowns in a 45–42 upset win.

Gubrud would lead Eastern to a 12–2 season and an appearance in the FCS Playoffs Semifinals. He finished 2016 with an FCS single-season record 5,160 passing yards and 48 touchdowns. Gubrud also led the team with 606 rushing yards and five touchdowns. Gubrud totaled 5,766 yards of total offense, which was just 33 yards shy of the FCS single-season record set by Steve McNair in 1994.

Gubrud was named the Co-Big Sky Conference Offensive Player of the Year, along with teammate Cooper Kupp. He was also named the FCS Player of the Year by the Touchdown Club of Columbus. Gubrud was also a finalist for the Walter Payton Award.

College statistics

Professional career
On January 11, 2021, it was announced that Gubrud had signed with the BC Lions. He retired on March 5, 2021.

References

External links
BC Lions bio
Eastern Washington Eagles bio

1995 births
Living people
American football quarterbacks
BC Lions players
Players of American football from Portland, Oregon
Eastern Washington Eagles football players
Washington State Cougars football players
Sportspeople from McMinnville, Oregon